Chuzhou is a prefecture-level city in eastern Anhui Province, China. It borders the provincial capital of Hefei to the south and southwest, Huainan to the west, Bengbu to the northwest, and the province of Jiangsu to the east. According to the 2020 census, the city of Chuzhou has a registered population of 3,987,054 inhabitants, whom 1,198,719 lived in the built-up (or metro) area made of 2 urban districts and now Lai'an county largely being urbanized. Nevertheless, 7,260,240 persons declared to be permanent residents. Its proximity to Nanjing and the building of a 54.4 km Metro line to Nanjing North station is transforming the city in a new Nanjing outer suburb.

Climate 
Chuzhou has a monsoon-influenced, humid subtropical climate (Köppen Cfa), with four distinct seasons.

Administration 
The prefecture-level city of Chuzhou administers eight county-level divisions, including two districts, a sub-prefecture-level city (Tianchang), a county-level city and four counties. The population information here presented uses 2010 census data of permanent residents.

These are further divided into 178 township-level divisions, including 86 towns, 78 townships and 14 subdistricts.

Tourism
Langya temple and the Deep Elegant Lake, located nearby, are popular tourist destinations.

Education

Chuzhou University (CZHU)
Chuzhou Radio and TV University

Notable people
Zhu Yuanzhang (1328–1398), founding emperor of the Ming dynasty
Wu Jingzi (1701–1754), Qing dynasty writer, author of the satirical novel The Scholars
Lu Yuanjiu (born 1920), physicist
Jiang Shan (born 1962), former Communist Party secretary of the city, dismissed for corruption

References

External links
Government website of Chuzhou (in Simplified Chinese)
Map of chuzhou

 
Cities in Anhui